Hook and Ladder No. 3 is a historic fire station located at 218 Central Avenue in the Jersey City Heights section of Jersey City in Hudson County, New Jersey. It was added to the National Register of Historic Places on August 24, 2015, for its significance in architecture and politics/government from 1896 to 1964. The fire station was closed in 2005.

See also
National Register of Historic Places listings in Hudson County, New Jersey

References

Buildings and structures in Jersey City, New Jersey
Fire stations completed in 1896
National Register of Historic Places in Hudson County, New Jersey
Fire stations on the National Register of Historic Places in New Jersey
Defunct fire stations in New Jersey
New Jersey Register of Historic Places